Table Tennis Touch is a table tennis video game developed by British indie studio Yakuto. It was originally released for iOS on May 15, 2014. An Android release followed on March 11, 2015.

Reception

The game has a score of 92 out of 100 on Metacritic, based on 5 critic reviews.

AppSpy wrote "Table Tennis Touch offers a fantastic simulation of the sport, but you will have to work if you want to reap rewards." Pocket Gamer wrote "A wonderfully well put together table tennis sim that deserves to be played by as many people as possible." 148Apps wrote "For fans and non-fans of ping pong alike, this is fun - plain and simple." Grab It Indie Games Magazine said "Table Touch Tennis mixes sports-sim realism with arcade escapism and stunning visuals to create a near-perfect storm of challenge and fun. Yakuto’s love for the sport is obvious and it results in an accessible yet deep game that even has a sense of humour." Arcade Sushi said "Table Tennis Touch manages to not only capture the fun of one of America’s most enduring pastimes, but it does so in a way that makes full use of video games as a medium, allowing for new types of experiences while keeping the core fun of the game intact."

References

External links

2014 video games
Android (operating system) games
IOS games
Table tennis video games
Video games developed in the United Kingdom